The Hoodoo Mountains are a mountain range in the northwest United States, in north central Idaho. They are part of the Clearwater Mountains and are the source of the Potlatch and Palouse rivers. On the west slope of the northern Rocky Mountains, the Hoodoos transition into the adjoining Palouse region, to the southwest.

North–South Ski Bowl, a former alpine ski area, is in the north end of the range in Benewah County. Opened in the 1930s, the area was originally owned and operated by Washington State College (now Washington State University) in Pullman. Alpine operations were discontinued in the 1990s and it is now a "park'n'ski" area for cross-country skiing off of State Highway 6.

References

External links
 Mountain Zone.com - Hoodoo Mountains - Idaho

Landforms of Latah County, Idaho
Mountain ranges of Idaho